Chathannoor Assembly Constituency or Chathannur Assembly Constituency is a legislative assembly constituency in Kollam district of Kerala, India. As of the 2016 assembly elections, the current MLA is G. S. Jayalal of CPI.

History
The constituency was previously known as Paravur Assembly Constituency. It was temporarily merged with Varkala constituency in 1957. Because of the merger, the Varkala constituency became a two-member constituency during the legislative assembly election of 1957 and interim election of 1960. Later in 1967, the new constituency was carved out of Varkala and is named as Chathannoor assembly constituency. The MLA office was shifted from Paravur to Chathannoor. In 1967, P. Ravindran of CPI became the first elected member from Chathannoor assembly constituency.

Structure
As per the recent changes on assembly constituency delimitations, the Chathannoor assembly constituency consists of Paravur municipal town and 5 neighbouring panchayaths including Chathannoor, Adichanalloor, Poothakkulam, Kalluvathukkal, Pooyappally.

Major institutions in the constituency
 Municipalities: 1 (Paravur)
 Panchayaths: 5 (Chathannoor, Adichanalloor, Poothakkulam, Kalluvathukkal, Pooyappally)
 Railway stations: 1 (Paravur railway station)
 Bus stations: 2 (Chathannoor KSRTC Bus Station, Paravur Municipal Bus Station)
 Medical college hospital: 1 (Kollam Government Medical College, Parippally)
 Government hospitals: 2 (Government MCH, Govt. Taluk Hospital, Paravur)
 Private hospitals: 3 (Azeezia Medical College Meeyannoor, Kollam KIMS Sithara Jn, Holy Cross Hospital Kottiyam)

Electoral history

Paravur Assembly Constituency: Travancore-Cochin Legislative Assembly Elections

Members of Legislative Assembly 
The following list contains all members of Kerala legislative assembly who have represented the constituency:

Key

 

* indicates bypolls

Election results 
Percentage change (±%) denotes the change in the number of votes from the immediate previous election.

Niyamasabha Election 2021 
There were 1,84,661 registered voters in the constituency for the 2021 Kerala Niyamasabha Election.

Niyamasabha Election 2016 
There were 1,79,928 registered voters in the constituency for the 2016 Kerala Niyamasabha Election.

Niyamasabha Election 2011 
There were 1,60,688 registered voters in the constituency for the 2011 election.

References

Assembly constituencies of Kerala
Government of Kollam
Politics of Kollam district
Assembly constituencies in Kollam district
1965 establishments in Kerala
1951 establishments in Travancore–Cochin
Constituencies established in 1951
Constituencies established in 1965